Carter MacIntyre (born 1979) is an American actor, best known for television roles on the series, Undercovers and  American Heiress.  His previous acting credits have included guest appearances on Smith and ER.  MacIntyre began appearing as CIA operative Leo Nash on the NBC series Undercovers in the Fall 2010 season. MacIntyre was cast as the new guardian angel on Drop Dead Diva for Season 4.

Carter is a native of Atlanta, Georgia, and a graduate of Wake Forest University.  He graduated from The Lovett School in 1997, a classmate of Christine Lakin.

Filmography

Films

Television

References

External links

Living people
American male television actors
Wake Forest University alumni
Male actors from Atlanta
American male film actors
21st-century American male actors
1979 births